Jan Schmidt-Garre (born 18 June 1962 in Munich), German film director and producer.

Life 
Jan Schmidt-Garre studied philosophy at the Hochschule für Philosophie der Jesuiten in Munich from 1982 to 1986 (M. A. with a semiotic thesis on Wagner's “Ring of the Nibelung”). He also studied feature film direction at Munich's Hochschule für Fernsehen und Film from 1984 to 1988. His mother is famous German critic Beate Kayser.

During this time he worked as a trainee and assistant director for, among others, Rudolf Noelte, Jean-Pierre Ponnelle, David Esrig, Joachim Herz and Harry Kupfer (at the Salzburg Festival, the Bayreuth Festival, the Metropolitan Opera in New York and at the Dresden Opera).

He studied conducting and musical theory with Sergiu Celibidache in Mainz, Munich and Paris.

In 1988 he founded PARS MEDIA, a production company whose films have received international acclaim for its documentary and feature films focusing on music and the arts. PARS MEDIA productions have been awarded numerous prizes worldwide, among them the main prizes at the film festivals in Chicago, Paris, Monte Carlo, Columbus/Ohio, Munich and Prague as well as a nomination for the German Film Award. PARS MEDIA films have been broadcast in over thirty countries, many have been distributed theatrically and appeared on Laser Disc, VHS and DVD.

Schmidt-Garre is staging operas on a regular basis at opera companies in Germany and Switzerland.

Schmidt-Garre, a member of the German Film Academy, lectures on directing and aesthetics at (among others) the HFF Munich and the Athanor Academy of Performing Arts. He is married to art dealer Philomene Magers. They have two children and live in Berlin.

Filmography (selected)

360° Figaro
Virtual reality opera film with Jacquelyn Wagner, 2018, 25 Min
Aida’s Brothers & Sisters
Music film, 1999, 90 Min

On DVD with Arthaus Musik
Belcanto - The Tenors of the 78 Era
Music documentary series, 1996, 390 Min. Prizes at the Columbus International Film Festival and at “Classique en images”, ICMA Award

On DVD with Naxos

Bound
Dance film with Saburo Teshigawara, based on a short story by Ilse Aichinger, 2002, 45 Min

On DVD with Arthaus Musik

Breath of the Gods - A Journey to the Origins of Modern Yoga
Documentary, 2012, 105 Min

On DVD with Kino Lorber, Jupiter Films, Blue Dolphin and UpLink
Bruckner’s Decision
Feature film, 1995, 80 Min

On DVD with Arthaus Musik
Celibidache – You Don’t Do Anything, You Just Let It Evolve
Documentary film, 1992, 100 Min. Nominated for the German Film Award, won the silver medal at the Chicago International Film Festival and the Midem Classique Award

On DVD with Arthaus Musik
Chopin at the Opera
Film Essay, 2010, 60 Min

On DVD with Arthaus Musik
Fidelio
Film version of a production with Jacquelyn Wagner, Norbert Ernst and Roman Trekel, 2018, 115 Min. Directed for the stage and for the screen by Jan Schmidt-Garre

On DVD with Euroarts
Fuoco sacro – A Search for the Sacred Fire of Song
Music documentary with Ermonela Jaho, Barbara Hannigan and Asmik Grigorian, 2021, 92 Min

Furtwängler’s Love
Film Essay, 2004, 70 Min. Awarded at "Golden Prague"

On DVD with Arthaus Musik
Home Music Berlin
Music film and concert series with Francesco Piemontesi, Christian Tetzlaff, Jacquelyn Wagner, Roman Trekel, Iddo Bar-Shai, Severin von Eckardstein, Elsa Dreisig, Olena Tokar, Sharon Kam, Matan Porat, Tabea Zimmermann and many more, 2020/21, 60 + 14 x 60 min

The Inner Film
Series of musical film essays with Zlata Chochieva, Francesco Piemontesi, Ermonela Jaho, Barbara Hannigan, Asmik Grigorian and many more, 2017–...

Legato – The World of the Piano
Music documentary and concert series, 2006–08, 720 
Min

On DVD with Medici Arts

Long Shot Close Up - Andreas Gursky
Art documentary, 2010, 60 Min

On DVD with Arthaus Musik

Measure – Color - Light
Art documentary, 1992, 45 Min

No More Wunderkind – Sergei Nakariakov
Music Documentary, 2004, 60 Min

On DVD with Arthaus Musik
Olafur Eliasson - Notion Motion
Art documentary, 2005

On DVD with Arthaus Musik

Opera Fanatic
Opera road movie, 1998, 90 Min. Prizes at the Munich International Documentary Festival and at “Golden Prague” (Czech Crystal)

On DVD with Arthaus Musik

Sophia – Biography of a Violin Concerto
Music Documentary with Sofia Gubaidulina and Anne-Sophie Mutter, 2008, 60
Min. Nominated for Prix Italia

On DVD with Arthaus Musik

Super Life
Documentary, 2014, 60 Min

On DVD with Belvedere

This not that - The Artist John Baldessari
Art Documentary, 2005, 90 Min.

On DVD with Arthaus Musik

Articles and essays
 Interview on directing operas

External links
 
 Website PARS Media
 Film clips
 DVDs with Arthaus

1962 births
Living people
Film directors from Munich